Very Truly Yours is a 1922 American silent romance film directed by Harry Beaumont and starring Shirley Mason, Allan Forrest and Charles Clary.

Cast
 Shirley Mason as Marie Tyree
 Allan Forrest as Bert Woodmansee
 Charles Clary as A.L. Woodmansee
 Otto Hoffman as Jim Watson
 Harold Miller as Archie Small
 Helen Raymond as Mrs. Evelyn Grenfall
 Hardee Kirkland as Dr. Maddox

References

Bibliography
James Robert Parish & Michael R. Pitts. Film directors: a guide to their American films. Scarecrow Press, 1974.

External links
 

1922 films
1920s romance films
American silent feature films
American romance films
American black-and-white films
Films directed by Harry Beaumont
Fox Film films
1920s English-language films
1920s American films
English-language romance films